Lestiphorus is a genus of sand wasps in the family Crabronidae. There are about 18 described species in Lestiphorus.

Species
These 18 species belong to the genus Lestiphorus:

 Lestiphorus becquarti (Yasumatsu, 1943)
 Lestiphorus bicinctus (Rossi, 1794)
 Lestiphorus bilunulatus A. Costa, 1867
 Lestiphorus cockerelli (Rohwer, 1909)
 Lestiphorus densipunctatus (Yasumatsu, 1943)
 Lestiphorus egregius (Handlirsch, 1893)
 Lestiphorus greenii (Bingham, 1896)
 Lestiphorus icariiformis (Bingham, 1908)
 Lestiphorus mellinoides (W. Fox, 1896)
 Lestiphorus mimicus (Arnold, 1931)
 Lestiphorus oreophilus (Kuznetzov Ugamskij, 1927)
 Lestiphorus pacificus (Gussakovskij, 1932)
 Lestiphorus peregrinus (Yasumatsu, 1943)
 Lestiphorus persimilis (R. Turner, 1926)
 Lestiphorus philippinicus Tsuneki, 1992
 Lestiphorus piceus (Handlirsch, 1888)
 Lestiphorus pictus Nemkov, 1992
 Lestiphorus rugulosus Wu & Zhou, 1969

References

External links

 

Crabronidae
Articles created by Qbugbot